The University of Houston–Downtown (UHD) is a public university in Houston, Texas. It is part of the University of Houston System and has a campus that spans  in Downtown Houston with a satellite location, UHD-Northwest in Harris County. Founded in 1974, UHD is the second-largest university in Houston. The university serves students in four academic colleges and offers 56 degree programs—46 bachelors and 10 masters. UHD also offers 15 undergraduate-completion programs and 3 fully online master's programs. Awarding more than 3,600 degrees annually, the UHD boasts more than 64,000 alumni.

History

UHD's expansion and physical growth continued in the late 1990s. The Willow Street Pump Station (listed among U.S. National Register of Historic Places) was renovated, and the Commerce Street Building opened, providing a new home for the College of Public Service. In the early 2000s, the Shea Street Building opened as the new home for the College of Business.

UHD celebrated a milestone when it enrolled the first class of MBA students in the College of Business. In 2016, a 26,000-square-foot Welcome Center opened its doors, and the O'Kane Gallery landed a new home featuring exhibitions for student, faculty, and local and national artists. Dedicated to the health and wellness of the Campus Community, the Wellness & Success Center opens its doors in January 2023.

Institutional structure

The University of Houston–Downtown (UHD) is one of four institutions in the University of Houston System. The institution is separately accredited, offers its own academic programs and confers its own degrees, and has its own administration. The organization and control of the University of Houston–Downtown is vested in the Board of Regents of the University of Houston System. The board has all the rights, powers, and duties that it has with respect to the organization and control of other institutions in the system; however, UHD is maintained as a separate and distinct institution.

Administration
The president is the chief executive officer of the University of Houston–Downtown, and the position reports to the chancellor of the University of Houston System. The president is appointed by the UHS chancellor and confirmed by the Board of Regents of the University of Houston System. Since March 2021, the president of the university is Loren J. Blanchard. The UHD administration is located on the ninth floor in the One Main Building.

 William I. Dykes (interim), 1974–1975
 J. Don Boney, 1975–1979
 Alexander F. Schilt, 1980–1987
 Manuel T. Pacheco, 1987–1991
 George W. Magner (interim), 1991–1992
 Max Castillo, 1992–2009
 William V. Flores, 2009–2016
 Michael A. Olivas (interim), 2016–2017
 Juan Sánchez Muñoz, 2017–2020
 Antonio D. Tillis (interim), 2020–March 2021
 Loren J. Blanchard, March 2021 – present

Academics

The University of Houston–Downtown is primarily an undergraduate institution. It offers 46 undergraduate and 10 graduate degree programs in the four following academic colleges: 
Marilyn Davies College of Business
College of Humanities & Social Sciences
College of Public Service
College of Sciences & Technology

Admissions
The University of Houston–Downtown was the final state university in Texas that had not yet abolished open admissions. The University of Houston System Board of Regents unanimously approved new admissions standards in February 2012, with closed admissions for UHD in the Fall of 2013.

Campus

The UHD campus consists of eight buildings at the north end of Downtown Houston and the south end of Northside, next to the crossing of Interstate 10 and Main Street. The university is located near the site where Houston was founded, Allen's Landing. Two of the university's buildings—One Main Building (formerly the Merchants and Manufacturers Building) and the Willow Street Pump Station—are listed in the National Register of Historic Places. UHD also offers classes online at three campuses: UHD-Northwest, Lone Star College Kingwood, and Lone Star College CyFair.

UHD's student current ethnic demographics are: 53% Hispanic, 20% Black, 13% White, 8% Asian, 2% International (regardless of race and/or ethnic origins), and 3% multi-racial. 63% of the student body identified as female, 37% identified as male.

In 2020, UHD opened the College of Sciences of Technology Building. The new Wellness & Success Center will opens its doors in January 2023.

The university is home to the Harry W. O'Kane Gallery (commonly known as the O'Kane Gallery, which was established in 1970by gifts from Harry W. O'Kane, Mary W. Bingman, and the Humphreys Foundation. The O’Kane Gallery presents five to six exhibitions that meet the diverse interests of UHD students, faculty, staff, alumni, and campus visitors. Exhibitions in all media provide educational support to various university courses and to nearby schools. The Gallery also functions as a site for university forums, meetings and receptions. Exhibitions are free and open to the public.

Although UHD does not have an intercollegiate varsity athletics program, it does offer its students a number of club sports and intramural sports in addition to numerous fitness programs. UHD's club sports teams are known as the Gators. The UHD mascot is known as Ed-U-Gator. The university and its community offer additional activities for students such as clubs, organizations, fraternities, and sororities.

The UHD campus is served by METRORail's UH–Downtown station on the Red Line.

Notable people and alumni
 Ghulam Bombaywala, restaurateur
 Juan Díaz, professional boxer and former Lightweight World Champion
 Mario Gallegos Jr., member of the Texas Senate
 Ed Gonzalez, Harris County Sheriff 
 Ananth Prabhu Gurpur, cyberlaw expert, Professor in Computer Engineering at the Sahyadri College of Engineering and Management, author
 Diana López, taekwondo practitioner (2008 Olympic bronze medalist)
 Charles McClelland, former Chief of the Houston Police Department (2010–2016)
 Phil Montgomery, member of the Wisconsin State Assembly
 Troy Nehls, Congressman from Texas.
 Devon Still, professional football player, founder of the Still Strong Foundation
 Lorenzo Thomas, poet and former faculty member

References

External links

 

 
Downtown
University of Houston-Downtown
Houston-Downtown
Houston-Downtown
Education in Harris County, Texas
Houston-Downtown
National Register of Historic Places in Houston
1974 establishments in Texas
Downtown Houston